Eb van der Kluft (23 May 1889 – 5 July 1970) was a Dutch footballer. He played in four matches for the Netherlands national football team between 1921 and 1923.

References

External links
 

1889 births
1970 deaths
Dutch footballers
Netherlands international footballers
Footballers from Amsterdam
Association football defenders
Blauw-Wit Amsterdam players